Xyris difformis, the bog yelloweyed grass, is a North American species of flowering plant in the yellow-eyed-grass family. It is native to the eastern and southern United States, eastern and central Canada, and Central America.

Xyris difformis is a perennial herb up to 90 cm (3 feet) tall with grass-like leaves up to 50 cm (20 inches) long, and yellow flowers.

Varieties
Xyris difformis var. curtissii (Malme) Kral - Belize, coastal states of USA from Texas to Virginia
Xyris difformis var. difformis - Nova Scotia, Ontario, USA (coastal states from Maine to Texas plus areas as far inland as Michigan, Oklahoma, Indiana, and Arkansas)
Xyris difformis var. floridana Kral - Belize, Honduras, Nicaragua, USA (coastal states from Louisiana to the Carolinas)

References

External links
Photo of herbarium specimen at Missouri Botanical Garden, collected in Virginia in 1980

difformis
Plants described in 1860
Flora of the Southeastern United States
Flora of Central America
Flora of the Northeastern United States
Flora of Eastern Canada
Flora of Texas
Flora of Oklahoma
Taxa named by Alvan Wentworth Chapman